Ni Yin (born 24 January 1999) is a Chinese footballer who plays for Nanjing City.

Club career
Ni joined Xi'an Wolves as a free agent in 2021.

Career statistics

.

Club

References

1999 births
Living people
Sportspeople from Yangzhou
Footballers from Jiangsu
Chinese footballers
China youth international footballers
Chinese expatriate footballers
Association football midfielders
China League One players
China League Two players
Villarreal CF players
Jiangsu F.C. players
Taizhou Yuanda F.C. players
Chinese expatriate sportspeople in Spain
Expatriate footballers in Spain